Modern man may refer to:

 Modernity, recent history and society, especially:
 The modern individual or everyman
 The contemporary human condition
 Anatomically modern humans, Homo sapiens of the last 200,000 years

Books and magazines
 Modern Man (magazine), a defunct monthly men's magazine

Film
 Modern Man (film), a 2006 experimental drama by Justin Swibel

Television
 Modern Men, American television sitcom starring Eric Lively, Josh Braaten, Max Greenfield, and Jane Seymour
 "Modern Men" (Only Fools and Horses), television episode of Only Fools and Horses

Music
 Modern Man (band)
 Modern Man (album), album by Stanley Clarke
 Modern Man (Maccabees), album by Dissident Prophet
 Modern Man (Michael Peterson album)
 "Modern Man", a song by Bad Religion from the album Against the Grain
 "Modern Man", a song by Black Flag from the album Loose Nut
 "Modern Man", a song by Arcade Fire from the album The Suburbs
 "Modern Man", a song by Ivan and Alyosha from the album It's All Just Pretend

See also
 Modern (disambiguation)
 Modern World (disambiguation)
 "Modern Woman", song by Billy Joel from the album The Bridge
 Man (word)
 Human